AAA vs MLW (also known as MLW x AAA and AAA vs. MLW Super Series) was a professional wrestling supercard event co-produced by the U.S-based Major League Wrestling (MLW) and the Mexico-based Lucha Libre AAA Worldwide (AAA), in partnership with Promociones EMW. It was held at Auditorio Fausto Gutierrez in Tijuana, Baja California, Mexico on March 13, 2020. The event was taped to be aired on future episodes of MLW Fusion; they would be the last episodes to air before the promotion went on hiatus due to the COVID-19 pandemic.

Production

Background
In August 2018, Major League Wrestling (MLW) announced that they had started a working agreement with Mexican-based promotion Lucha Libre AAA Worldwide (AAA). Nearly two years later on February 5, 2020, MLW announced that it would be holding its first co-promoted event with AAA on March 13, held in conjunction with AAA's local Tijuana partner Promociones EMW. This marked the second MLW event promoted in Mexico, following the Crash/Major League Wrestling show held on October 5, 2019.

Storylines
AAA vs MLW featured nine professional wrestling matches scripted by MLW and AAA featuring wrestlers involved in scripted feuds. The wrestlers portrayed either heels (referred to as rudos in Mexico, those that play the part of the "bad guys") or faces (técnicos in Mexico, the "good guy" characters) as they performed.

Results

See also
The Crash/Major League Wrestling show
2020 in professional wrestling

References

2020 in professional wrestling
March 2020 events in Mexico
Major League Wrestling shows
Professional wrestling in Mexico
Professional wrestling joint events
Lucha Libre AAA Worldwide shows